The 777th Radar Squadron is an inactive United States Air Force unit. It was last assigned to the Northwest Air Defense Sector, Tactical Air Command, stationed at Mountain Home Air Force Base, Idaho. It was inactivated on 15 September 1991.

From 1951-1981, the unit was a General Surveillance Radar squadron providing for the air defense of North America.   From 1988 to 1991 it operated Over The Horizion Backscatter (OTH-B) radar for Tactical Air Command.

Lineage
 Constituted as the 777th Aircraft Control and Warning Squadron
 Activated on 18 December 1950
 Redesignated as 777th Radar Squadron (SAGE) on 15 July 1960
 Redesignated as 777th Radar Squadron on 1 February 1974
 Inactivated on 30 September 1980
 Activated on 1 October 1988
 Inactivated on 15 September 1991

Assignments
 542d Aircraft Control and Warning Group, 18 December 1950
 28th Air Division, 6 February 1952
 25th Air Division, 1 March 1959
 Portland Air Defense Sector, 1 March 1960
 26th Air Division, 1 April 1966
 25th Air Division, 15 September 1969 - 30 September 1980
 Northwest Air Defense Sector 1 October 1988 - 15 September 1991

Stations
 Klamath AFS, California, 18 December 1950 - 30 September 1981
 Mountain Home AFB, Idaho, 1 October 1988 - 15 September 1991 (HQ Site)
 Christmas Valley AFS, Oregon (OTH-B Transmitter site)
 Tule Lake AFS, California (OTH-B Receiver site)

See also
 Over-the-horizon radar
 List of United States Air Force aircraft control and warning squadrons

References

 Cornett, Lloyd H. and Johnson, Mildred W., A Handbook of Aerospace Defense Organization  1946 - 1980,  Office of History, Aerospace Defense Center, Peterson AFB, CO (1980).
 Winkler, David F. & Webster, Julie L., Searching the Skies, The Legacy of the United States Cold War Defense Radar Program,  US Army Construction Engineering Research Laboratories, Champaign, IL (1997).
 Mountain Home AFB

External links

Radar squadrons of the United States Air Force
Aerospace Defense Command units